ISO 15924, Codes for the representation of names of scripts, is an international standard defining codes for writing systems or scripts (a "set of graphic characters used for the written form of one or more languages"). Each script is given both a four-letter code and a numeric code.

Where possible the codes are derived from ISO 639-2, where the name of a script and the name of a language using the script are identical (example: Gujarātī ISO 639 guj, ISO 15924 Gujr). Preference is given to the 639-2 Bibliographical codes, which is different from the otherwise often preferred use of the Terminological codes.

4-letter ISO 15924 codes are incorporated into the IANA Language Subtag Registry for IETF language tags and so can be used in file formats that make use of such language tags. For example, they can be used in HTML and XML to help Web browsers determine which typeface to use for foreign text. This way one could differentiate, for example, between Serbian written in the Cyrillic (sr-Cyrl) or Latin (sr-Latn) script, or mark romanized or transliterated text as such.

Maintenance
ISO appointed the Unicode Consortium as the Registration Authority (RA) for the standard. The RA is responsible for appointing a registrar who works with a Joint Advisory Committee (JAC) in developing and implementing the standard. The registrar from 2004 to 2018 was Michael Everson, and from January 2019 the registrar has been Markus Scherer, a technical director of the Unicode Consortium. The JAC consists of six members: one representative of the RA (Markus Scherer), one representative of ISO 639-2 (Randall K. Barry of the Library of Congress), one representative of ISO TC37 (Christian Galinski), one representative of ISO TC46 (Peeter Päll), and two representatives of ISO/IEC JTC 1/SC 2 (Rick McGowan and Ken Whistler, both also officers of the Unicode Consortium).

Script codes

Numeric ranges
 Hieroglyphic and cuneiform scripts
 Right-to-left alphabetic scripts
 Left-to-right alphabetic scripts
 Alphasyllabic scripts
 Syllabic scripts
 Ideographic scripts
 Undeciphered scripts
 Shorthands and other notations
 (unassigned)
 Private use, alias, special codes

Special codes
: 50 Codes reserved for private use
: Emoji
: Code for inherited script
: Mathematical notation
: Symbols
: Code for unwritten languages
: Code for undetermined script
: Code for uncoded script

Exceptionally reserved codes

Two four-letter codes are reserved at the request of the Common Locale Data Repository (CLDR) project:
: Reserved for the language-neutral base of the CLDR locale tree
: Reserved for the boolean value "true"

List of codes
This list of codes is from the ISO 15924 standard.

Relations to other standards
The following standards are referred to as indispensable by ISO 15924.
 ISO 639-2:1998 Codes for the representation of names of languages — Part 2: Alpha-3 code
 ISO/IEC 9541-1:1991 Information technology — Font information interchange — Part 1: Architecture
 ISO/IEC 10646-1:2020 Information technology — Universal Multiple-Octet Coded Character Set (UCS)

For definition of font and glyph the standard refers to
 ISO/IEC 9541-1:1991

Around 160 scripts are defined in Unicode. Through a linkpin called "Property Value Alias", Unicode has made a 1:1 connection between a script defined, and its ISO 15924 standard. See Script (Unicode).

See also
 List of scripts with no ISO 15924 code

Notes

References

External links
 ISO 15924:2004
 ISO 15924 Registration Authority (Unicode)
 Official ISO 15924 code lists
 Overview of changes in time

 
15924
Writing systems
2004 introductions